The Madrid–Galicia high-speed rail line is a high-speed railway line in Spain that links the city of Madrid with the region of Galicia via the cities of Olmedo, Zamora, Ourense and Santiago de Compostela. The line also connects the Atlantic Axis high-speed rail line to the rest of the Spanish AVE high-speed network.

History 
The line shares the same railway for the section between Madrid and Olmedo with the Madrid–León high-speed rail line. This part was inaugurated on 23 December 2007 along with the entire section Madrid–Segovia–Valladolid. Construction on the section between Ourense and Santiago de Compostela started in 2004 and the  part was completed and connected with the Atlantic Axis high-speed rail line in Santiago de Compostela on 10 December 2011. Since November 2015, trains in Alvia commercial service used this part on routes between Galicia and other Spanish regions.

In July 2015 it was announced that the traction power supply for the Olmedo-Pedralba de la Pradería (near Puebla de Sanabria) section would be switched-on on 7 August 2015. The  southern section, between Olmedo ( north of Madrid on the Madrid–Leon line) and Zamora entered revenue service on 17 December 2015 and initially served by Alvia trains. In January 2017 it was announced that the boring of the Bolaños tunnels along the Verín - Ourense section of the line was completed. The central part, which crosses some of Spain's most remote and fragile natural areas, was initially expected to open in 2018, but has again been delayed to end 2021. The  new built section between Zamora and Otero de Sanabria (near Puebla de Sanabria) was completed at a cost of 898 million euros and put in service on 26 October 2020. The  last remaining part between Puebla de Sanabria and Ourense was completed on 21 December 2021 and the whole line was commercially inaugurated in AVE service on 21 December 2021, after 20 years of work.

Operations 
There are 10 services each day in both directions.

Incidents 
In July 2013, an S730 train derailed in a non-LAV (conventional line) stretch near the Santiago de Compostela station.

References

High-speed railway lines in Spain
Railway lines opened in 2011